Valentin Creţu (born 9 September 1989) is a Romanian luger who has competed since 2000. His best finish at the FIL World Luge Championships was 27th in the men's singles event at Altenberg in 2012.

Cretu qualified for the 2010 Winter Olympics where he finished 31st in the men's singles event.

References
 FIL-Luge profile

External links
 

1989 births
Living people
Lugers at the 2010 Winter Olympics
Lugers at the 2014 Winter Olympics
Lugers at the 2018 Winter Olympics
Lugers at the 2022 Winter Olympics
Olympic lugers of Romania
Romanian male lugers